Make Yourself At Home may refer to:

Make Yourself at Home, the English translation of the title of the BBC television programme Apna Hi Ghar Samajhiye
The Make Yourself at Home EP by The Starting Line